{{DISPLAYTITLE:Prostaglandin E2 receptor}}
The prostaglandin E2 (PGE2) receptors are G protein-coupled receptors that bind and are activated by prostaglandin E2. They are members of the prostaglandin receptors class of receptors and include the following Protein isoforms:

 Prostaglandin E2 receptor 1 (EP1) - 
 Prostaglandin E2 receptor 2 (EP2) - 
 Prostaglandin E2 receptor 3 (EP3) - 
 Prostaglandin E2 receptor 4 (EP4) -

Studies
An antagonist of a prostaglandin E2 receptor has been shown to serve as an affective contraceptive for female macaques while unaffecting their menstrual cyclicity as well as hormonal patterns. The exact reason behind the reduced amount of successful pregnancies of primates during the study is unclear due a number of possibilities that may affect such result.
Inhibition of the prostaglandin E2 EP4 receptor has been shown to inhibit tumor growth, angiogenesis, lymphangiogenesis, and metastasis.

See also
 Prostaglandin receptors
 Prostanoid receptors
 Prostaglandin

References

External links
 

Eicosanoids
G protein-coupled receptors